The 1961 World Sportscar Championship was the ninth season of FIA World Sportscar Championship motor racing.  It was contested over a five race series, which ran from 25 March  to 15 August 1961. The title was won by Italian manufacturer Ferrari.

Season schedule and results

Schedule with results

Manufacturers Championship

Points were awarded to the top 6 places, in the order of 8-6-4-3-2-1, however manufacturers were only awarded points for their highest finishing car in each race, with no points awarded to places filled by other cars from the same manufacturer..

Only half points were awarded at the Pescara race as it was staged over a four-hour duration, which was less than the FIA’s minimum requirement of six hours or 1000km.

Only the best 3 results out of the 5 race season counted towards the championship totals of each manufacturer.  Discarded points are shown within brackets.

The cars
The following models contributed to the nett points totals of their respective manufacturers in the 1961 World Sports Car Championship.

 Ferrari 250 TR61 & Ferrari 246 SP
 Maserati Tipo 61 & Maserati Tipo 63
 Porsche 718 RS61 
 O.S.C.A. S1600

References

External links
 1961 World Sportscar Championship race results at wspr-racing.com
 World Sportscar Championship points tables at wspr-racing.com

 
World Sportscar Championship seasons
World